Bracebridge is a suburb of Lincoln, Lincolnshire, England.

Under the Local Government Act 1888 Bracebridge was part of Kesteven and considered a separate town within that county. The Local Government Act 1894 changed Bracebridge's status to an Urban District within Lincoln in the county of Lindsey.  Bracebridge now falls under the City of Lincoln Council, within the county of Lincolnshire.

Bracebridge was formerly served by the now-defunct Bracebridge railway station which was located to the rear of the Manse estate which is accessible from Brant Road. Bracebridge lowfields consist of Brant Road area to Waddington Village in the south and Newark Road area to St. Catherines roundabout at South Park. Using Cross O'Cliff hill from the South Park roundabout, one can access Bracebridge Heath, which has a mixed development of old and new properties and commercial units. It is possible to access the town of Sleaford from 'the heath' as it is locally known via the A15 or Grantham via the A607. Both Bracebridge and Bracebridge Heath are served by regular bus services. The Number 1 goes from Lincoln City bus station to Grantham via Cross O'Cliff hill and the A607, Bracebridge Lowfields are served by the 13/14 Service which travels around the Larne Road area and on to Waddington village. Also serving Bracebridge is the number 27 which travels to ASDA in North Hykeham; this follows the route of Newark Road.

All Saints' Church dates from the 11th century, but was remodelled in 1875 by J L Pearson. It was further restored in 1895 and the 20th century and is a Grade I listed building.

References

External links

Areas of Lincoln, England
Former civil parishes in Lincolnshire